Adiós Abuelo (English language: Goodbye Alexandra, Andrea) is a 1973 Argentine drama film directed by Carlos Rinaldi and written by Norberto Aroldi. The film starred Ángel Magaña and Raúl Padovani.

Plot

Cast
Juan Alighieri   
Amelia Bence   
Constanza Maral   
Ubaldo Martínez

Release and acclaim

External links
 

Argentine drama films
1973 films
Spanish drama films
1970s Spanish-language films
1973 drama films
Films directed by Carlos Rinaldi
1970s Argentine films